Laurent Magnaval (born 24 March 1991) is a French rugby union player. His position is Scrum-half and he currently plays for SC Albi in the Federale 1. He began his career with RC Toulonnais before moving to Mont-de-Marsan in 2012.

References

1991 births
Living people
French rugby union players
People from Rosny-sous-Bois
Racing 92 players
Rugby union scrum-halves
Sportspeople from Seine-Saint-Denis